Gabriel Sowah Laryea (29 January 1924 – 23 June 2009) was a Ghanaian sprinter who competed in the 1952 Summer Olympics.

References

1924 births
2009 deaths
Ghanaian male sprinters
Olympic athletes of Ghana
Athletes (track and field) at the 1952 Summer Olympics
Place of birth missing
20th-century Ghanaian people